Panesthia cribrata, commonly called the Australian wood cockroach, is a wood-eating species found in rotten logs. It is found from south east Queensland south to the east coast to Tasmania, also seen at Norfolk Island. It depends on wood for sustenance, and manufactures enzymes that digest cellulose.

References

Cockroaches
Insects of Australia
Insects described in 1864